Lodi T.I.B.B. is a station in Milan, Italy on Line 3 of the Milan Metro. The station is located at Piazzale Lodi and is partially named after the company Tecnomasio Italiano Brown Boveri (T.I.B.B.) which built underground trains for years. This is an underground station with two tracks in a single tunnel.

Lodi T.I.B.B. was opened on 12 May 1991 as part of the extension of the line from Porta Romana to San Donato.

The station is near the overground Milano Porta Romana railway station.

References

Line 3 (Milan Metro) stations
Railway stations opened in 1991
1991 establishments in Italy
Railway stations in Italy opened in the 20th century